Charles Weston may refer to:

 Charles Weston, 3rd Earl of Portland (1639–1665)
 Charles Weston (horticulturalist) (1866–1935), active in Eastern states of Australia
 Charles Weston (Royal Navy officer) (1922–1999), President of the Royal Naval College, Greenwich